Reflectory, is an album by baritone saxophonist Pepper Adams which was recorded in 1978 and originally released on the Muse label.

Reception

The Allmusic review by Ken Dryden states "Adams' approach to the baritone sax is sometimes a bit more aggressive and less melodic than Gerry Mulligan, which results in occasional inadvertent reed squeaks in his tricky opener, "Reflectory." Better is the outspoken yet still lovely treatment of Duke Ellington's "Sophisticated Lady." The most surprising track is his rapid-fire arrangement of the ballad "That's All," in which Hanna takes top solo honors. This recommended album is worth acquiring".

Track listing
All compositions by Pepper Adams except where noted.
 "Refelectory" – 7:00
 "Sophisticated Lady" (Duke Ellington) – 5:37
 "Etude Diablolique" – 7:16
 "Claudette's Way" – 6:11
 "I Carry Your Heart" – 6:53
 "That's All" (Alan Brandt, Bob Haymes) – 6:32

Personnel
Pepper Adams – baritone saxophone
Roland Hanna – piano
George Mraz – bass
Billy Hart – drums

References

Pepper Adams albums
1978 albums
Muse Records albums